Aioli is a mediterranean sauce based on garlic.

Aioli may also refer to:

 L'Aiòli, a Provençal newspaper founded in 1891
 Aïoli garni, a traditional Provençal dish

See also
 Aeolia (disambiguation)